Luciano is an Italian, Spanish and Portuguese given name and surname. It is derived from Latin Lucianus, patronymic of Lucius ("Light"). The French form is Lucien, while the Basque form is Luken.

Single name 
 Luciano (rapper) (born 1994), German rapper of Mozambican descent 
 Luciano (singer) (born 1964), reggae artist from Jamaica
 Luciano (Brazilian singer), (real name Welson David de Camargo), part of the Brazilian duo Zezé Di Camargo & Luciano
 Luciano (DJ), (real name Lucien Nicolet), electronic music DJ and producer
 Le Rat Luciano, French rapper, part of the French rap group Fonky Family
 Luciano (footballer, born 1978)
 Luciano (footballer, born 1993)
 Luciano (footballer, born 2003)

Given name
Luciano D'Alessandro González (born 1977), Venezuelan-Colombian actor and model 
Luciano Armani (1940–2023), Italian cyclist
Luciano Barbosa (born 1976), Brazilian squash player
Luciano Becchio, Argentine footballer
Luciano Benetton (born 1935), Italian billionaire businessman, one of the co-founders of Benetton Group
Luciano Berio (1925–2003), Italian composer
Luciano Canepari, Italian phonetician
Luciano Castro (born 1975), Argentine actor
Luciano Erba (1922–2010), Italian poet
Luciano Federico (born 1968), Italian actor
Luciano Figueroa, Argentine footballer
Luciano García Alén, spanish doctor
Luciano Hang (born 1962), Brazilian billionaire businessman, the co-founder of the Havan department store chain
Luciano Huck (born 1971), Brazilian TV host and entrepreneur
Luciano Kulczewski (1896–1972), Chilean architect 
Luciano Leggio (1925–1993), Italian criminal and leading figure of the Sicilian Mafia
Luciano Narsingh (born 1990), Dutch footballer
Luciano Pavarotti (1935–2007), Italian operatic tenor
Luciano Soprani (1946–1999), Italian fashion designer
Luciano de Souza (born 1972), Brazilian footballer
Luciano Siqueira de Oliveira (born 1975), Brazilian footballer
Luciano José Pereira da Silva (born 1980), Brazilian footballer
Luciano da Silva (Triguinho) (born 1979), Brazilian footballer
Luciano Szafir (born 1968), Brazilian model and actor
Luciano Vassalo, Italian-Ethiopian footballer
Luciano Vincenzoni (1926–2013), Italian screenwriter
Luciano Zacharski (born 1985), Argentine actor
Luciano Zerbini, Italian discus thrower and shot putter

Surname

People 
 Ascanio Luciano (1621–1706), Italian architectural painter
 Fábio Luciano (born 1975), Brazilian international footballer
 Juan R. Luciano (born c. 1962), US-based Argentine businessman
 Lilia Luciano (born 1984), American journalist
 Lucky Luciano (1897–1962), Italian-American mobster
 Michelle Luciano, Scottish psychologist
 Ron Luciano (1937–1995), American baseball umpire

Fictional characters 
 Lightning Larry Luciano, a one-time character in SpongeBob SquarePants

References 

Italian masculine given names
Spanish masculine given names
Sammarinese given names